Trifurcula kalavritana is a moth of the family Nepticulidae. It was described by A. and Z. Laštuvka in 1998. It is known from Peloponnese, Greece.

References

Nepticulidae
Moths of Europe
Moths described in 1998